This is a list of alleged psychic abilities that have been attributed to real-world people. Many of these abilities pertain to variations of extrasensory perception or the sixth sense. Superhuman abilities from fiction are not included.

Psychic abilities

Astral projection or mental projection – The ability to voluntarily project an astral body or mental body, being associated with the out-of-body experience, in which one’s consciousness is felt to temporarily separate from the physical body.
Atmokinesis – The ability to control the weather such as calling rainfall or storms.
Automatic writing – The ability to draw or write without conscious intent.

Bilocation — The ability to be present in two different places at the same time, usually attributed to a saint.

 
Energy medicine – The ability to heal with one's own empathic, etheric, astral, mental or spiritual energy.
Ergokinesis - The ability to influence the movement of energy, such as electricity, without direct interaction.

Levitation or transvection – The ability to float or fly by mystical means.

Materialization — The creation of objects and materials or the appearance of matter from unknown sources.
Mediumship or channeling – The ability to communicate with spirits.

Petrification — The power to turn a living being to stone by looking them in the eye.
Prophecy (also prediction, premonition, or prognostication) — the ability to foretell events, without using induction or deduction from known facts.
Psychic surgery – The ability to remove disease or disorder within or over the body tissue via an "energetic" incision that heals immediately afterwards.
Psychokinesis or telekinesis – The ability to influence a physical system without physical interaction, typically manifesting as being able to exert force, control objects and move matter with one's mind.
Pyrokinesis – The ability to control flames, fire, or heat using one's mind.

Iddhi – Psychic abilities gained through Buddhist meditation.

Shapeshifting or transformation — The ability to physically transform the user's body into anything.

Thoughtography - The ability to impress an image by ‘burning’ it on a surface using one’s own mind only.

Xenoglossy — The ability of a person to suddenly learn to write and speak a foreign language without any natural means such as studying or research, but that is often rather bestowed by divine agents.
Witnessing - The gift of being visited by high profile spiritual beings such as Mary, Jesus or Fudosama (Acala) from Buddhist Traditions.
Inedia - The ability to survive without eating or drinking, multiple cases have resulted in starvation or dehydration.

Extrasensory perception 

Extrasensory perception, or sixth sense, is an ability in itself as well as comprising a set of abilities.
Clairvoyance — The ability to see things and events that are happening far away, and locate objects, places, people, using a sixth sense.
Divination – The ability to gain insight into a situation using occult lists.
Dowsing – The ability to locate water, sometimes using a tool called a dowsing rod.
Dream telepathy - The ability to telepathically communicate with another person through dreams.

Dermo-optical perception - The ability to perceive unusual sensory stimuli through one’s own skin.
Psychometry or psychoscopy – The ability to obtain information about a person or an object by touch.
Precognition (including psychic premonitions) – The ability to perceive or gain knowledge about future events, without using induction or deduction from known facts.
Remote viewing, telesthesia or remote sensing – The ability to see a distant or unseen target using extrasensory perception.
Retrocognition or postcognition – The ability to supernaturally perceive past events.
Telepathy – The ability to transmit or receive thoughts supernaturally.

References

Psycho abilities